Ashfield Green can refer to:
Ashfield Green, Mid Suffolk, a hamlet near Stradbroke in Suffolk, England
Ashfield Green, St Edmundsbury, a hamlet near Wickhambrook in Suffolk, England